Operation Santa Claus is a yearly initiative undertaken by the United States Postal Service. It was started in 1912 when United States Postmaster General Frank Hitchcock authorized local postmasters to start responding to needy children, with the first one starting at the James Farley Post Office.

For years, the program has invited children to send letters to Santa Claus at 123 Elf Road, North Pole 88888. Members of the public may volunteer to "adopt" these letters. Letter adopters reply to the children and may send them gifts. While the adoption program used to operate out of selected post offices to which letters had been distributed and volunteers had to visit those post offices to receive the letters they were adopting, since 2019, the adoption program has been carried out online.

Operation Santa Claus program in Alaska 

The Salvation Army in cooperation with the Alaska Air National Guard use C-130 Hercules to distribute every year gifts to children living in remote places in Alaska before Christmas.

See also 
 Operation Christmas Drop, annual U.S. airforce drop over Micronesia

References

External links
Official website
USPS Holiday Newsroom
Guide to Operation Santa by volunteers

Santa Claus
United States Postal Service
Christmas in the United States
Recurring events established in 1912
1912 establishments in the United States